The 1997-98 season was Motherwell's 13th consecutive season in the Scottish Premier Division, and their final season before the top division of Scottish Football was reformed as the Scottish Premier League.

Squad

Transfers

In

Loans in

Out

Loans out

Released

Competitions

Premier League

Results summary

Results by round

Results

Source:

League table

Scottish Cup

League Cup

Squad statistics

Appearances

|-
|colspan="14"|Players who appeared for Motherwell but left during the season:

|}

Goal scorers

Clean sheets

Disciplinary record

See also
 List of Motherwell F.C. seasons

References

1997-98
Scottish football clubs 1997–98 season